Gurun is a mukim in Kuala Muda District, Kedah, Malaysia. "Gurun" in English means desert, however the town does not resemble in the slightest the meaning of its English translation. Rather, it derived its name from the word "gerun", which means terrify or "kurun" meaning elephant in the Siamese dialect. These words are associated with an incident during the reign of King Ekataat’s grandsons, Sultan Jaafar Mad Azam Syah, Sultan of the Islamic State of Ayutthia, who was killed in 1876 by the invading Thai armies when they crushed his body using an elephant. This incident took place behind the current Gurun Police Station.

Government and Politics
Administratively, is under the district of Kuala Muda and falls within the local government administration of Sungai Petani Municipal Council. Gurun is designated as N22 for the Kedah State Legislative Council Zone and is represented by Dr Leong Yong Kong (National Front - BN) (incumbent) who defeated Salma binti Ismail (People Justice Party - PKR) with majority of 1,296 votes in the 2013 General Election. Its Member of Parliament (P12 - Jerai) is Datuk Seri Jamil Khir bin Baharom (National Front - BN) who defeated Mohd. Firdaus Ja'afar (Malaysian Islamic Party - PAS) by a majority of 1,196 votes.

Geography
Gurun is located between Guar Chempedak to the north and Bedong to the south and can be reached via a highway; the North-South Expressway, and it even has its own train station. The main road junction in the town center connects the eastern part of Kedah to the town of Jeniang and the district of Sik. The junction was currently shifted to a new location situated in front of Gurun Post Office due to the construction of Malaysian double track railroad. The construction of Gurun Railway Station is a part of the Bukit Mertajam - Alor Setar railway extension project started in late 1912 and completed in 1915. The project was carried out under the Federated Malay States Railway Administration and the Pinang Tunggal to Gurun track was officially opened to the public on 1 March 1915 and the Gurun to Alor Star on 4 October 1915. The station was now demolished in order to make way for a new railway station located about 1 kilometer to north of the old station.

Gunung Jerai, formerly known as Kedah Peak, is a massive limestone outcrop situated to the west of Gurun and is the highest point in Kedah rising . It is the main tourist attraction to Gurun.

Economy
Gurun is well known for its corn stalls. Rows of these stalls stand along the federal trunk road from the town of Gurun to the town of Guar Chempedak. Gurun is also known for the starting point of Wan Mat Saman Canal, the longest canal in Malaysia with approximately 36 km that stretch out until Alor Setar town, where it connects Gurun River to Kedah River. The construction of the canal started on 13 August 1885 and was completed on 12 July 1896 and the soil that was dig out to create the canal formed "batas ban", which formed the foundation for the current federal trunk road to the state capital Alor Setar.

Until the 1990s, Gurun is well known for its vegetables products and was recognised as the main vegetables and corn producer for Kedah. Apart from that, several rubber estates such Havard Estate and Jentayu Estate in the main commodity players for Kedah. Gurun also has its own iron ore mines located to the south of Gurun town, a place known as Bukit Merah.

Gurun was designated as the industrial area for heavy industry in the 1980s by the government. Initially, the Perwaja Beam and Rolling Mill was set up. Then the landscape of Gurun slowly changed. Gurun is now the home of major factories, such as Naza, Modenas, Perwaja Steel, & Petronas Fertilizer Kedah.

The most remarkable feature of this facility is, that the static inverter hall of this facility looks like a Chinese building.

History
During the period of Thai invasion in 1876-1881 and continued until the early 1900s, Gurun became well known as a base for local heroes such as Panglima Nayan, who operated from his hometown of Jeniang, about 10 miles to the east of Gurun. The strategic location of Gurun that connects every town in Kedah had enabled these warriors to plan and executed their activities freely without any fear from the occupying forces.

During the Second World War, Gurun became the line of defense for the 11th Indian Division in the Battle of Gurun in early December, 1941. However, the British strategy was poorly executed and they were easily overrun by the Japanese army.

During the Malayan Emergency period, Gurun was among the first areas declared as a "White Area". Gurun then served as the forward staging base for the Commonwealth forces launching their operations against communist insurgents. Horbart Camp, located on 8 mile peg of the Gurun-Jeniang road, was the base for these activities and also served as the training camp for units waiting to be sent into the jungle for operations. The Horbart Camp still functions as a training camp today.

Infrastructure
Probably the most prominent building in Gurun is the former United Transport Company (UTC) bus station. However today, the building is no longer functioned as bus station because it was turned into a grocery store. However the taxi station is still where it was 30 years ago.

Gurun enjoyed treated water earlier than electricity. By the 1980s, majority of Gurun area enjoyed these two services. By the 1980s also North South Expressway project start to kick off which linked Gurun to Alor Setar. However the expressway exit was not at the present location but located at Kampung Guar Nenas. The original road for this exit is still exist today and still usable by the public.

Gurun has a railway station which is served by KTM Intercity and KTM ETS trains.

Schools
In 1911, Kedah State Government opened a Malay School in this town and the school still survives until now. It is now known as Sekolah Rendah Kebangsaan Gurun Pusat. The school provides a modern education for the rural folks in Central Kedah while the Islamic schools, the pondok, are mostly concentrated in Guar Chempedak and Yan area. Nevertheless, Kedah State Government has opened a modern Islamic school in Gurun in the 1970s which emulated the successful Maktab Mahmud in Alor Setar. The school which originally located nearby to Gurun Magistrate Court was later moved to the south of Gurun town, its present location.

Before the liberation of Malaysian education in the 1990s, Gurun has its own private school known as Akademi Langkasuka. The school provides opportunity to students who failed their national examinations such as Sijil Rendah Pelajaran and Sijil Pelajaran Malaysia was then, to resit the said examinations because the public schools were unable to cater for this requirement. This school was then moved to Guar Chempedak in the mid-80s. The original location of this school in Gurun is now housed Institut Kemahiran Langkasuka, a vocational training institution.

SJKC Choong Hwa, Gurun was established originally to the south of Shell Petrol Station in the 1960s following the need of education for the children of Chinese settlers which were relocated to Kampung Baru, Gurun following the Malayan Emergency. The school was then moved to Taman Gurun Jaya in 1999 following the school expansion program in order to cater for the increasing numbers of its students.

Schools in Gurun or nearby include:
 SMK Gurun, Gurun
 SJKC Choong Hwa, Gurun (峨崙中华华小)
 SJKC Mah Wah, Padang Lembu (马华华小)
 SK Gurun Pusat, Gurun 
 SK Sri Jerai, Gurun
 SK Batu Empat, Jalan Jeniang
 SMK Batu Lima, Jalan Jeniang
 SJKT Kalaivaani, Padang Lembu

References

Kuala Muda District
Mukims of Kedah
Gurun (Malaysia)